Rencontre East is a small, outport community in Newfoundland and Labrador, Canada located north east of Belleoram, and west of Terrenceville in Fortune Bay. The population was 115 in the 2021 census.  This small community is not connected to any surrounding areas by road but is accessible by scheduled ferry service from ports in Pool's Cove and Bay L'Argent.

All of the roads are dirt and ATVs are the main source of transportation. The community uses breakwaters to hold the roads in place and keep the water from washing them away.

The main industry is cod and lobster fishing. Rencontre East was the location of one of only a few molybdenum mines in Canada's history. The mine was located at Ackley City at Rencontre Lake just north of the town. The mine was closed soon after, with only two-thousand tonnes of mineral being exported.

The town has two grocery stores, a volunteer fire department, an all grade school (St. Stephen's) and a community centre. There are two churches, one Anglican (St. Stephen's) and one Catholic (St. Joseph's).

St. Stephen's all-grade school has just 24 students, from kindergarten to grade 12. The school however has undergone some changes in recent years, a fitness room was constructed in 2008.

Aquaculture is an important economic driver, with the advent of salmon farming. As of July 2011, aquaculture in Rencontre East became fully operational, with more than 20 of the town's people working on the three sites. Combined, there are more than 2 million salmon in the sites. As the traditional cod and lobster fisheries are waning, mostly because it becoming uneconomical to do so and the age of the fishermen nearing that of retirement, modern fish farming will reverse the downturn of the town.

Rencontre East was one of the areas in Fortune Bay affected by the September 2019 event in which 2.6 million farmed salmon died. Following the die-off, images of salmon residue being dumped into the ocean near Rencontre East were widely circulated in local media.

Demographics 

See also
List of cities and towns in Newfoundland and Labrador
Newfoundland outport

References 

Populated coastal places in Canada
Road-inaccessible communities of Newfoundland and Labrador
Towns in Newfoundland and Labrador
Car-free zones in Canada
Fishing communities in Canada